The 1963 USA Outdoor Track and Field Championships men's competition took place between June 21-23 at Public School Stadium in St. Louis, Missouri. The women's division held their championships separately at the Welcome Stadium in Dayton, Ohio.  The Public School Stadium was one of the first stadiums to sport an all-weather track made of asphalt and rubber.  

The Marathon championships were run in October at the Yonkers Marathon.

Results

Men track events

Men field events

Women track events

Women field events

See also
United States Olympic Trials (track and field)

References

 Results from T&FN
 results

USA Outdoor Track and Field Championships
Usa Outdoor Track And Field Championships, 1963
Track and field
Track and field in Missouri
USA Outdoor Track and Field Championships
USA Outdoor Track and Field Championships
USA Outdoor Track and Field Championships
Sports competitions in St. Louis
Track and field in Ohio
Sports competitions in Dayton, Ohio